Liana Drahová Vozárová (born 22 April 1953 in Liberec) is a Slovak former figure skater who competed for Czechoslovakia. Competing in pairs with partner Peter Bartosiewicz, she finished in 12th place at the 1968 Winter Olympics. Later, competing as a singles skater, she won the bronze medal at the 1974 European Championships.

Results

Pair skating with Bartosiewicz

Single skating

References 

Czechoslovak female pair skaters
Czechoslovak female single skaters
Olympic figure skaters of Czechoslovakia
Figure skaters at the 1968 Winter Olympics
1953 births
Living people
Slovak female single skaters
European Figure Skating Championships medalists
Figure skaters from Bratislava